Edward Crawford may refer to:

People
 Ed Crawford (born 1964), American lead singer of Firehose, also known as "ed fROMOHIO"
 Ed Crawford (American football) (1934–2017), American college athlete and NFL player
 Edward F. Crawford (attorney) (1919–1975), American lawyer and politician from New York
 Edward F. Crawford (businessman) (born 1938), American businessman and current U.S. Ambassador to Ireland
 Edward James Frederick Crawford (c. 1809–1880), South Australian brewer

Fictional characters
 Edward Crawford (EastEnders), of the BBC soap opera EastEnders

See also
 Edward Crawford Magrath (1881–1961), English-born Australian politician
 Edward Crawford Turner (1872–1950), American lawyer